The Revolutionary Communist Centre of India (Marxist–Leninist) was a splinter Maoist communist terrorist outfit in India. Later, it split into the Revolutionary Communist Centre of India (Marxist-Leninist-Maoist) party and the Revolutionary Communist Centre of India (Maoist) party.

Revolutionary Communist Centre of India (Maoist) merge with Maoist Communist Centre of India, which again merge with Communist Party of India (Maoist). Revolutionary Communist Centre of India (Marxist-Leninist-Maoist) is still existing.

Defunct communist parties in India
Left-wing militant groups in India
Political parties with year of establishment missing
Political parties with year of disestablishment missing